Chlorogonium elegans is a species of freshwater green algae in the family Haematococcaceae.

References

External links 
 Chlorogonium elegans at AlgaeBase

Chlamydomonadales
Plants described in 1918